Stephen James Ireland (born 22 August 1986) is an Irish former professional footballer who played as an attacking midfielder.

Ireland began his career with Cobh Ramblers before joining English club Manchester City in 2001. He made his professional debut in September 2005 and soon established himself as a regular at the City of Manchester Stadium and his performances saw him earn international recognition with the Republic of Ireland. However, a row with Steve Staunton saw his international career come to an abrupt end.

In September 2010, Ireland was transferred to Aston Villa in a swap deal with James Milner. After a slow start to his Villa career, he was loaned out to Newcastle United where he only played twice. In the 2011–12 season, he improved and won the Fans' Player of the Season award. However, he fell out of the first team under Paul Lambert and in September 2013 he joined Stoke City on loan, before making the move permanent in January 2014. After being released from Stoke in 2018, he joined Bolton Wanderers for a brief spell before retiring.

Club career

Early career
Born in Cork, County Cork, Ireland started his career in Cobh, playing junior football for Cobh Ramblers, a team his father Michael had previously played for. As a schoolboy, Ireland had trials with a number of British clubs, though several were discouraged by his Osgood-Schlatter disease, which he suffered from in his mid-teens. He eventually chose Manchester City, where he moved in August 2001, as a fifteen-year-old.

Manchester City
In 2005, at the age of 18, he joined English club Manchester City. He played for the first team in a number of pre-season friendlies and made his competitive debut on 18 September 2005, against Bolton Wanderers, coming on as an 81st-minute substitute. He subsequently made his first competitive start against Doncaster Rovers on 21 September 2005. He won the Man of the Match award on his first Premier League start against Everton on 2 October 2005. He then started the next six matches for City, which won him a contract to keep him at the club until 2009. In the remainder of the season he participated in around half of Manchester City's matches, ending the season with a total of 16 starts and 12 substitute appearances. On 26 December, Ireland scored his first Premier League goal for City, a left footed volley from 20 yards. The goal proved to be the only goal in a vital 1–0 victory at Sheffield United's Bramall Lane. On 18 February, Ireland rounded off the scoring for Manchester City in a 3–1 away win over Preston North End in the fifth round of the FA Cup with a stunning volley from outside the area.

Having started the 2007–08 Premier League season well with City, Ireland scored the only goal, a volley, in a 1–0 home win over Sunderland. His celebration for the goal courted some controversy, Ireland dropped his shorts to reveal a pair of underpants sporting the Superman logo, however the FA decided a warning would be the fairest course of action. Then in November against Reading, he scored to keep Manchester City's home record at 100%. Two weeks later, he was sent off in the 2–1 loss at Tottenham Hotspur, and received a three match ban. Ireland scored a goal in the reverse fixture, which led Manchester City to a 2–1 home victory over Spurs. He scored his final goal of the season with a sweet strike in the 2–3 loss to Fulham. He got the ball just outside the left side of the penalty box and curved it over Kasey Keller into the top right corner. He finished the 2007–08 season with four goals.

He returned to the first team in a good individual and team performance in the 3–0 win against West Ham United. He finished the match with two assists, crossing for Elano to strike home. He opened his tally in the 3–0 away win at Sunderland. He scored again in the 2–2 draw at Newcastle United on 20 October. He scored both goals in the 2–2 draw at Hull City on 16 November, and opened the score in the successive league match against Arsenal. After netting in a 2–1 win over Everton, Ireland took his seasons tally to 13 in a memorable season for the Irishman.

On 20 May 2009, he was named Manchester City's Senior Player of the Year for his blistering performances throughout the 2008–09 season and as a result, secured a new five-year contract, keeping him at the club until 2014. He later became the Greater Manchester Player of the Year. He opened his account in the 2009–10 season with an opening day goal in the 2–0 win at Blackburn Rovers.

In December 2009, Mark Hughes was sacked as manager and was replaced by former Inter Milan manager Roberto Mancini. With the good form of Nigel de Jong, Vincent Kompany and new signing Patrick Vieira at the club, Ireland spent most of the second half of the season as a substitute. By the end of the 2009–10 season, he only scored three goals, which were all before Mancini's arrival. Mancini said Ireland must "change his head" in order to play.

Aston Villa
At the start of the 2010–11 Premier League season, Ireland was targeted to be transferred with loan to Aston Villa in exchange for James Milner, but the deal was held up when he demanded £2 million from Manchester City to agree to the move. On 17 August 2010 it was reported the deal had been done, and he was at Aston Villa's Bodymoor Heath Training Ground for a medical. The final price was £8million in a part exchange for Milner. Ireland signed a 4-year deal with the Midlands club. After completing the move, Ireland criticised his former club, saying that its young players were "money-obsessed" and that: "I guess James Milner must think the grass is greener on the other side. He's going to get a shock soon because it's definitely not that way." Ireland made his debut for the club on his 24th birthday in an away fixture at Newcastle United. Ireland started and played for the full duration of the match as Villa were beaten 6–0. However, by the end of October 2010, Ireland had been dropped from the Villa team with manager Gérard Houllier publicly stating that he needed to work harder at his game. 

On the final day of the transfer window, 31 January 2011, Ireland joined Newcastle United on loan until the end of the season, with a view to a permanent deal. Ireland was already injured when he joined Newcastle and suffered a number of setbacks, including a controversial nightclub incident with teammate Leon Best the night before a match. He finally made his debut on 19 April 2011 in a 0–0 draw with Manchester United, appearing as a 65th-minute substitute. However, after appearing only twice and playing just 49 minutes of football for the Tyneside club, Ireland was ruled out for the rest of the season with an ankle injury, and was returned to Aston Villa.

At the start of the 2011–12 season, Ireland stated his intentions to remain at Aston Villa and fight for his place in the team under new manager Alex McLeish, despite having a disappointing first term at the club. It was also confirmed that he would take the number 7 jersey from Ashley Young who had recently joined Manchester United. Alex McLeish warned Ireland to create headlines on the pitch after being pictured posing with shisha pipe on Twitter. On 31 December 2011, Ireland scored his first ever goal for Villa in a 3–1 away win at Chelsea, scoring the opener and assisting the third goal in a man of the match winning performance. At the end of the season, after some impressive displays, Ireland was voted Aston Villa's Supporters' player of the season.

After a positive start to the 2012–13 season, Ireland broke a bone is his wrist during Villa's 4–1 loss away at Southampton on 22 September in which he had assisted a Darren Bent goal. Manager Paul Lambert revealed it would rule him out for "a few weeks". Paul Lambert left Ireland out of his squad for the second half of the 2012–13 season for 'footballing reasons'. At the end of the season Ireland was heavily linked with a move away from the club and began training with the reserves.

Stoke City

On 2 September 2013, Ireland joined Stoke City on loan for the 2013–14 season, which would see him link up with Mark Hughes. Speaking after joining Stoke, Ireland expressed the hope that his loan spell would help him resurrect his career, stating: "It's been really frustrating as I take my job seriously and it's been difficult for me not being on the team bus playing games. I'm just so grateful to the manager here at Stoke for giving me the opportunity to build up my career again. I've absolutely got a point to prove and I'm dying to get back into the swing of things. This is a massive opportunity and I'm still only 27. It's a vital year for me to be playing week in, week out."

Ireland made his Stoke debut on 14 September 2013 in a 0–0 draw against his former club Manchester City. Ireland scored his first goal for Stoke on 25 September 2013 in a 2–0 League Cup win over Tranmere Rovers. On 9 November 2013, he scored against Swansea City in a 3–3 draw. He made his move permanent on 14 January 2014. On 15 April 2014, Ireland signed a new three-year contract with Stoke keeping him contracted until the summer of 2017. Ireland played 29 times in 2013–14 as Stoke finished in 9th position.

Ireland scored twice in the FA Cup against Wrexham on 4 January 2015. He also scored in the next round against Rochdale. On 28 February 2015, Ireland suffered a deep cut on his calf which required 15 stitches following a challenge by Hull City defender Maynor Figueroa.

Ireland was again overlooked by Hughes in 2015–16 as he made 16 appearances of which only three were starts and none were in the Premier League. On 10 May 2016, he suffered a broken leg in training, keeping him sidelined for a lengthy period. Ireland missed the entire 2016–17 season due to injury. In July 2017, he signed six-month contract extension to enable him to continue his rehabilitation. Another contract extension until the end of the season followed in December. Ireland made only five appearances in 2017–18 as Stoke suffered relegation to the EFL Championship. He was released by Stoke at the end of the season.

Bolton Wanderers
Ireland joined EFL Championship side Bolton Wanderers on 9 October 2018. On 20 December 2018, Ireland left Bolton without playing a game, though he did play two matches for Bolton's Development Squad, after having his contract cancelled by mutual consent. Ireland stated in June 2020 that he regretted joining Bolton as they were going through financial trouble and assumed he did not play as he had playing bonuses in his contract.

International career
Ireland represented Ireland at under-15, under-16 and under-17 level, but when called up to under-18 level he had a dispute with coach Brian Kerr after he was left out of the side for a match in Ireland's home town of Cobh and told to watch the match from the stands. The team lost the match 4–0, and Kerr suggested Ireland would be involved in the next match, in nearby Cork City. When Ireland was again left out, he requested to return to his club, and Kerr informed him that he would never play for the Republic of Ireland while Kerr was manager.

In January 2006 Kerr was replaced as Ireland manager by Steve Staunton. In Staunton's first squad, for a match against Sweden, Ireland received a senior call up for the first time. Ireland came on a substitute in the match, replacing John O'Shea. He scored his first international goal on 7 October 2006 in a 5–2 loss to Cyprus. On 7 February 2007, Ireland saved the Republic of Ireland from a draw with San Marino with a last minute injury time goal. Final score was 2–1.

On 24 March 2007, he scored the first ever goal in Croke Park against Wales. This was his third international goal in just four matches. He also scored against Slovakia in Bratislava on 8 September 2007.

Controversy
In September 2007, Ireland was at the centre of controversy when, in the immediate aftermath of a Republic of Ireland international match and days before their crunch match against the Czech Republic, coach Steve Staunton informed him of a telephone call just received from his girlfriend reporting the death of his maternal grandmother. Staunton quickly consented to Ireland's compassionate leave on these grounds, a private jet was chartered for his return.

However the media quickly discovered that Ireland's grandmother was not dead, at which point Ireland announced it was his paternal grandmother who died but yet again, reporters discovered that Ireland's paternal grandmother was also still alive, and her relatives had threatened to sue one newspaper that reported her death. Ireland changed his story again, saying one of his grandfathers had divorced, and it was his second wife who had died. That was also quickly discovered to be untrue.

Ireland eventually came out with the truth, admitting he had invented a reason to leave the Irish team in order to visit his girlfriend in Cork, who, he claimed, had a miscarriage. "I decided at that stage that I must tell the truth and admit I had told lies," Ireland said. "I realise now it was a massive mistake to say my grandmothers had died and I deeply regret it."

Exile
Speculation abounded that Ireland might make himself available for a call-up to the national squad to face Georgia on 11 February 2009. However, when the squad was announced on 19 January, the player's name did not feature, and Liam Brady took the opportunity to explain to the press that he and Trapattoni had previously come to an agreement with the player whereby he would inform them when he felt like playing again, and that so far no contact had been made from the player's end.

On 19 February 2009, it was reported that Ireland had intimated to Manchester City teammate Shay Given that he would like to represent Ireland at the World Cup in South Africa in 2010 and that a return to the international fold was imminent, but when the Irish squad to face Bulgaria on 28 March and Italy on 1 April was announced, his name was once again omitted. Trapattoni said at the accompanying press conference that he himself did not believe Ireland would return, stating that when he had met with the player months previously he had appeared withdrawn and reluctant to look the Ireland manager in the eye.

In May 2009, Ireland said that he would probably not return to the national team: "I always say 'never say never' because it's hard not to, but I don't think I'll ever go back." In August 2010, he restated that he would not return: "I watch Ireland matches like anyone else might do at this stage, but I don't feel a part of it at all. It doesn't make me feel like I should go back and play again. That question is gone for me and the answer won't change my mind."

On 30 March 2012, Ireland suggested that he would be willing to return to international football after Euro 2012. In May 2014, after unsuccessful attempts at trying to contact Ireland by Republic of Ireland manager Martin O'Neill, Ireland's agent got in touch with the FAI to say that he would not be available for the friendly matches against Turkey, Italy, Costa Rica and Portugal.

In an interview in 2019, the player explained that the reason he never returned to play for Ireland was to look after his children.

Personal life
Ireland is married and has three children. He owned a home in Prestbury, Cheshire and a number of custom built vehicles. Following the conclusion of his contract with Bolton Wanderers, he listed the home for sale and sold it in 2019 for £3.75 million (€4.3 million). Ireland has a number of tattoos including a large pair of angel wings on his back.

Career statistics

Club

International

Scores and results list Republic of Ireland's goal tally first, score column indicates score after each Stephen Ireland goal.

Honours
Individual
FAI Young International Player of the Year: 2007
Manchester City Player of the Season: 2009
Aston Villa Supporters' Player of the Season: 2012

References

External links

1986 births
Living people
Association footballers from Cork (city)
Republic of Ireland association footballers
Association football midfielders
Manchester City F.C. players
Aston Villa F.C. players
Newcastle United F.C. players
Stoke City F.C. players
Bolton Wanderers F.C. players
Premier League players
Republic of Ireland under-21 international footballers
Republic of Ireland international footballers
Republic of Ireland expatriate association footballers
Irish expatriate sportspeople in England
Expatriate footballers in England